This was a new event on the ITF Women's Circuit in 2011.

Kang Seo-kyung and Kim Na-ri won the tournament, defeating Kim Ji-young and Yoo Mi in the final, 5–7, 6–1, [10–7].

Seeds

Draw

References 
 Draw

Samsung Securities Cup - Women's Doubles
2011 Women's Doubles